Laveno-Mombello is a comune (municipality) in the Province of Varese in the Italian region Lombardy, located about  northwest of Milan and about  northwest of Varese. It sits at the foot of Sasso del Ferro.

History 

The name of Laveno comes from two denominations: the first is from the Latin word "labes", that means "landslide"; the second denominations is from the Roman general Titus Labienus, that give his name to the port (Portus Labienus) and subsequently to the surrounding area. The radix of the name are actually just in the main road of the town, via Labiena. Titus Labienus is considered responsible for naming Mombello too, after a battle against the Gauls ("mons belli" means "war hill"). A different interpretation says that the meaning is "monte bello", that is "beautiful hill".

In the 19th century, Laveno Mombello was  home to important ceramic industries. Today, it is a port town that connects the province of Varese with Verbania and the famous Borromean Islands across Lake Maggiore.

The municipality was formed in 1927 to encompass the previously separate centres of Laveno, Mombello and Cerro.

Laveno-Mombello borders the following municipalities: Caravate, Castelveccana, Cittiglio, Ghiffa, Leggiuno, Sangiano. Stresa and Verbania are in front of the town across the lake.

Transport 

Laveno-Mombello is served by Laveno-Mombello railway station, managed by Rete Ferroviaria Italiana, and by Laveno-Mombello Nord railway station, managed by Ferrovienord. A car-ferry links the town with Intra (Verbania) on the western side of Lago Maggiore.

Main sights

Demographic evolution

External links
 Regione Lombardia (Laveno)
 LagoMaggiore.net/laveno-mombello
 Laveno on Lake Maggiore - Photograph Gallery.

References

Cities and towns in Lombardy
Populated places on Lake Maggiore